Buddugre Castle (sometimes referred to as Tomen Bedd-Ugre, Castell Cwm Aran, Tomen Bedd Turc and Bedd-y-gre) was a motte and bailey defensive fortification overlooking the River Ithon, located in the community of Llanddewi Ystradenny, in Radnorshire (modern-day Powys), Wales. It is believed to have been built as a defensive measure in the medieval period, during the 12th century, as a timber castle.

History
Owain, King of Gwynedd is credited with building the castle in Budugre in 1149 as a defense measure for the vale of Clwyd. This brought Owain close to conflict with Madog ap Maredudd, the ruler of Powys who was opposed to any encroachment of his powers. It is also said that it could have been built by Cadwallon, set high on top of a hill instead of in a valley akin to Norman castles of this period.

Features
The castle structures on the mound located at the southern extremity of a ridge that faces south. The slopes of the ridge are towards west and south and on its east towards the Ithon Valley but are long gone, but the land still clearly bears the marks of a ditched motte. The ditched bailey measures . There are indications of a rectangular range surrounding the motte which measures  in an eastern direction. The top of the mound is flat, over which it is conjectured that a structure made either of timber or stone had existed as a defensive measure. Also seen close to the mound are "crop marks" which could have been a court, the llys. Y The ditch that surrounds the motte has two 2 causeways over it  running from the south and south-west. There is entry to the bailey from the south.

References

 John Edward Lloyd, A History of Wales: From the Norman Invasion to the Edwardian Conquest, p. 96.

Bibliography

External links

 Aerial views of the site

Castles in Powys
Castle ruins in Wales
Motte-and-bailey castles